At the 1912 Summer Olympics, five fencing events were contested.

Medal summary

Participating nations
A total of 184 fencers from 16 nations competed at the Stockholm Games:

Medal table

References

 
1912 Summer Olympics events
1912
1912 in fencing
International fencing competitions hosted by Sweden